George Townsend Warner (9 May 1841 – 22 November 1902) was an English clergyman and schoolmaster and a cricketer who played in three first-class cricket matches between 1860 and 1863. He was born at Southampton in Hampshire and died at Torquay in Devon.

Warner was educated at Harrow School and at Trinity College, Cambridge. As a cricketer, he played as an opening batsman in two matches against Cambridge University: one for the Cambridge Town Club in 1860 and the other for the Marylebone Cricket Club (MCC) in 1863. Though he played in trial matches and lesser games for Cambridge University, his only first-class match for the university's first team saw him bat in the lower order and he was not successful. It is not known if he batted right- or left-handed.

Warner graduated from Cambridge University with a Bachelor of Arts degree in 1864, and this was converted to a Master of Arts in 1868. He was ordained as a Church of England deacon in 1864 and as a priest two years later and served as curate at parishes in Devon until 1875. He then became headmaster of the Newton Abbot College for 20 years; one of his pupils there was the writer Arthur Quiller-Couch who wrote of him that he was "a gentleman with every attribute of a good Head Master save a sense of justice, of which he had scarcely a glimmer". From 1895 to his death in 1902 he returned to church work as rector of Alfold, Surrey.

Warner's younger brother William was a much more successful cricketer at Cambridge University.

References

External links

1841 births
1902 deaths
English cricketers
Cambridge University cricketers
Cambridge Town Club cricketers
Marylebone Cricket Club cricketers
People educated at Harrow School
Alumni of Trinity College, Cambridge
19th-century English Anglican priests